Wyoming Highway 435 (WYO 435) is a short  Wyoming state road in northeastern Washakie county that serves the Ten Sleep Fishing Hatchery.

Route description
Wyoming Highway 435 begins at US Route 16 eight miles east of Ten Sleep. From US 16, Highway 435 travels in a southeasterly direction to the Ten Sleep Fish Hatchery. At 0.78 miles, state maintenance of WYO 435 comes to an end before the roadway crosses Ten Sleep Creek and the Fish Hatchery entrance. The hatchery located at milepost 1.17.

Major intersections

References

External links

Wyoming State Routes 400-499
WYO 435 - US 16 to Ten Sleep Fish Hatchery

Transportation in Washakie County, Wyoming
435